The Endpoint Handlespace Redundancy Protocol is used by the Reliable server pooling (RSerPool) framework for the communication between Pool Registrars to maintain and synchronize a handlespace.

It is allocated on the application layer like the Aggregate Server Access Protocol.  It is a work in progress within the IETF.

External links
 Thomas Dreibholz's Reliable Server Pooling (RSerPool) Page
 IETF RSerPool Working Group
 Endpoint Handlespace Redundancy Protocol (ENRP)
 Aggregate Server Access Protocol (ASAP) and Endpoint Handlespace Redundancy Protocol (ENRP) Parameters
 Threats Introduced by Reliable Server Pooling (RSerPool) and Requirements for Security in Response to Threats
 Reliable Server Pooling Policies

Internet protocols
Internet Standards
Session layer protocols